SHC may refer to:

Science
 Src homology 2 domain-containing, in structural biology, a structural domain in signal transduction proteins
 SHC1, a human gene
 Sirohydrochlorin, a chemical precursor to various enzymes.
 Specific heat capacity, in physics, a substance's heat capacity per unit mass, usually denoted by the symbol c or s
 Spontaneous human combustion, a theory that, under certain conditions, a human being may burn without any apparent external source of ignition

Schools
 Spring Hill College, a predominantly undergraduate Jesuit university in Mobile, Alabama
 Schreyer Honors College, an honors program at the Pennsylvania State University
 Stanford Humanities Center, a humanities organization located at Stanford University
 Sacred Heart Cathedral Preparatory, a co-ed Catholic school in San Francisco, California, United States
 Sacred Heart College, Auckland, a Catholic, Marist secondary school in Auckland, New Zealand

Religion
 Sacred Heart Cathedral (disambiguation), a name for multiple Catholic cathedrals
 Society of the Holy Cross (Korea), an order of nuns in the Anglican Church of Korea

Other uses
 Canadian Historical Association (Société historique du Canada)
 Shc (shell script compiler) for Unix-like operating systems
 South Health Campus, in Calgary, Alberta, Canada
 A song on the Sacred Hearts Club album by Foster the People